Director is the fourth studio album by American R&B singer Avant. It was released by Geffen Records on April 25, 2006 in the United States. The album reached number one on the US Billboard Top R&B/Hip-Hop Albums, while peaking at number four on the US Billboard 200. As of 2008, Director sold 600,456 copies in the US.

Three singles were released: "You Know What" (number 58 Hot R&B/Hip-Hop Songs), "4 Minutes" (number 9 Hot R&B/Hip-Hop Songs and number 52 Hot 100) and "Lie About Us". "4 Minutes" describes a man's desperate attempt to mend a broken relationship.

Track listing

Notes
  denotes co-producer
Sample credits
"This Is Your Night" contains interpolations from the composition "Where Did We Go Wrong", written by Sam Dees and Jeffrey Osbourne.

Charts

Weekly charts

Year-end charts

References

2006 albums
Avant albums
Albums produced by Bryan-Michael Cox
Albums produced by Jermaine Dupri
Albums produced by the Underdogs (production team)